Khalid bin Salleh (29 February 1948 – 23 July 2018) was a Malaysian actor and poet.

Brief biography 
He was brought up in his aunt's family. He graduated from secondary school in Batu Pahat. At first he earned his living by selling medicines in the streets.

Creativity 
Played in the theater and in the films, recited his poems in solo performances. He was one of the leading actors in the theater of Krishen Jit and Dinsman in the 1970s (the play "This is not suicide", etc.). He took part in Monodrama Festivals in Taiwan (1989), Japan (1991), Calcutta (1994) and Delhi (1995). In 2014 he successfully performed the play-monologue "The seller of medicines."

The film "Kaki Bakar" with his participation was demonstrated at the Cannes Film Festival in 1995 (in 1996 this film received the highest prize of the Belgian Film Festival).

His poems were published in the anthology "Tidak apa-apa" (Nothing, 1998)  and "Kalau aku jadi PM” (If I became Prime Minister, 2014). In 2011, he published a book-reflection on the current government policy and the fate of the indigenous population of the country "Melayu Hilang Di Dunia” (The Malays will disappear from the face of the earth).

Translations into Russian
In the collection "Pokoryat Vishinu” (Conquer the height) 

 Nothing (Tidak apa-apa)
 Listen to the voice of love (Dengarkanlah suara kemesraan)

Filmography

Film

Television series

Television

Theater

Awards and nominations 
 Prize of the 43rd Asian-Pacific Film Festival in Taipei for the best performance  (film "Jogho") (1998)
 Prize of the 11th Malaysian Film Festival for the best performance of the supporting role (film "Aziza - Legend") (1994)

References

External links
 

1948 births
2018 deaths
Malaysian people of Malay descent
Malaysian writers
Malaysian male film actors
20th-century Malaysian actors
Malaysian male stage actors
People from Selangor